The Horton sphere is a spherical pressure vessel, which is used for storage of compressed gases such as propane, liquefied petroleum gas  or butane in a liquid gas stage.

History

'Horton sphere' or 'Hortonsphere' is named after Horace Ebenezer Horton (1843-1912), founder and financier of a bridge design and construction firm in about 1860, merged to form the Chicago Bridge & Iron Company (CB&I) in 1889 as a bridge building firm and constructed the first bulk liquid storage tanks in the late nineteenth and early twentieth centuries. CB&I built the first field-erected spherical pressure vessels in the world at the Port Arthur, Texas refinery in 1923, and subsequently claimed 'Hortonsphere' as a registered trademark. A patent was lodged on Sept 23, 1947, to address the problem of damage to the supports caused by heat expansion.

Because of their distinctive form, some have become subject to conservation campaigns such as that at Poughkeepsie NY.

Construction and use

Initially, Hortonspheres were constructed by riveting together separate wrought iron or steel plates, but from the 1940s, were of welded construction. The plates are formed in roller plants and cut to patterns.

CB&I accounts for a large  proportion of spherical pressure vessels in the world. They are used extensively for LPG, as well as for other volatile gasses. CB&I identifies the following uses: gasoline, anhydrous ammonia, vinyl chloride monomer (VCM), naphtha, propane, propylene, ethane, butane, NGL and butadiene. Cryogenic storage is also possible for LNG, methane, ethylene, hydrogen, and oxygen. Gases that may be stored include hydrogen, nitrogen, oxygen, helium and argon. Other uses have been applied to the Hortonsphere including space chambers, hyperbaric chambers, environmental chambers, vacuum vessels, process vessels, test vessels, containment vessels and surge vessels.

See also
 Storage tank

References

Oil storage
Petroleum production
Storage tanks